The Woodland Folk is a six part children's book series released between 1983–1984 written and illustrated by Antonio Lupatelli under the pseudonym Tony Wolf.

The titles include:

Meet the Woodland Folk (1983, Dean)
The Woodland Folk Meet the Gnomes (1983, Dean)
The Woodland Folk Meet the Giants (1983, Dean)
The Woodland Folk Meet the Fairies (1984, Dean), or The Woodland Folk in Fairyland (1984, Rand McNally)
The Woodland Folk Meet the Elves (1984, Dean)
The Woodland Folk Meet the Dragons (1984, Dean), or The Woodland Folk in Dragonland (1984, Rand McNally)

Adaption
The book series has been adapted into an anime television series: Bosco Adventure.

References

Series of children's books